The 1992–93 ECHL season was the fifth season of the ECHL.  In 1992, the league saw numerous changes in team membership.  The Winston-Salem Thunderbirds move to Wheeling, WV, becoming the first franchise to make a major relocation, the Roanoke Valley Rebels announced that they were changing their name to the Roanoke Valley Rampage, and the Cincinnati Cyclones announced that they were moving to the International Hockey League and were being replaced with a franchise in Birmingham, AL.  The fifteen teams played 64 games in the schedule.  The Wheeling Thunderbirds finished first overall in the regular season.  The Toledo Storm won their first Riley Cup championship.

League realignment
The ECHL announced a realignment of the two divisions in the light of recent changes in team membership.

East Division
Greensboro Monarchs
Hampton Roads Admirals
Johnstown Chiefs
Raleigh Icecaps
Richmond Renegades
Roanoke Valley Rampage
Wheeling Thunderbirds

West Division
Birmingham Bulls
Columbus Chill
Dayton Bombers
Erie Panthers
Knoxville Cherokees
Louisville Icehawks
Nashville Knights
Toledo Storm

Regular season
Note: GP = Games played, W = Wins, L = Losses, T = Ties, Pts = Points, GF = Goals for, GA = Goals against, Green shade = Clinched playoff spot, Blue shade = Clinched division

Riley Cup playoffs

Bracket

E. is short for East Division
W. is short for West Division

1st round

Quarterfinals

Semifinals

Riley Cup finals

ECHL awards

See also
 ECHL
 ECHL All-Star Game
 Kelly Cup
 List of ECHL seasons

ECHL seasons
ECHL season